A Knitted Tie, or Knit Tie is a type of neckwear which can be worn with casual wear, or business casual.  It most often worn with a dress shirt or casual collar shirt. A knit tie can also be worn in circumstances where a casual collar shirt, jeans and sport coat are acceptable for men.

See also
Necktie

References

Neckwear